Melinda Darby Dyar is a planetary geologist, mineralogist, and spectroscopist whose research relates to the evolution of the Solar System. She studies the redox state of iron and the abundance of hydrogen using Mössbauer, x-ray absorption, and FTIR spectroscopy in the Solar System planets, specifically Earth, Moon, Mars, Mercury, and Venus.

Personal life and education 
Dyar attended North Central High School in Indianapolis, Indiana. Her father was an engineer who worked on gas turbine engines at General Motors in Indianapolis where he also helped build the Apollo Lunar Modules.

In 1980, Dyar graduated from Wellesley College where she double-majored in art history and geology. For her senior thesis, she identified rock formations along the Charles River in the Broadmoor Wildlife Sanctuary, run by the Massachusetts Audubon Society, in Natick, Massachusetts. She received her Ph.D. in the geochemistry doctoral program at Massachusetts Institute of Technology in 1985.

Career 
In 1985, Dyar wrote an influential review paper on the use of Mössbauer spectroscopy, which utilizes the Mössbauer effect in order to measure the absorption of gamma rays emitted by a nucleus without energy being lost in recoil. Dyar determined the concentrations of oxygen that were present at the time of formation from measurements of the valence levels of iron.

Dyar serves on three of the eight NASA Solar System Exploration Virtual Institutes. She and her team helped calibrate NASA's Curiosity rover and contributed by using the Chemistry and Camera (ChemCam) tool that sits on the front of the rover to analyze Martian minerals for hydrogen and soil.

Dyar is a senior scientist at the Planetary Science Institute and at Toolbox for Research and Exploration (TREX).

In 1986, she served as a professor of geology at the University of Oregon in Eugene. She currently is a Kennedy-Schelkunoff Professor of Astronomy and Chair of Astronomy at Mount Holyoke College where she supports undergraduate researchers in her Mineral Spectroscopy Laboratory. She has written more than 260 peer-reviewed papers in scientific journals, analyzing geologic materials using Raman, LIBS, XANES, and FTIR, and two textbooks on mineralogy and geo-statistics that have been widely adopted in college classrooms.

Dyar is the deputy principal investigator for the VERITAS (spacecraft) mission to Venus selected by NASA on June 2, 2021.

Achievements 
Dyar has been awarded more than $10 million in diverse grants from NASA and NSF.

On September 27, 2016, Dyar received the G.K. Gilbert Award from the Planetary Geology Division of the Geological Society of America for her outstanding contributions to the solution of fundamental problems in planetary geology. She became the fourth woman and the second Wellesley alumnus to receive the award.

In 2017, Dyar was awarded the Hawley Medal from the Mineralogical Society of Canada.

In 2018, she received the Eugene Shoemaker Distinguished Scientist Medal from NASA's Solar System Exploration Research Virtual Institute for her extensive contributions to the field of lunar science.

Publications

References 

Astrogeologists
American geologists
American women geologists
Living people
Year of birth missing (living people)
Solar System articles needing attention
Planetary scientists
Women planetary scientists
Mount Holyoke College faculty
Wellesley College alumni
Massachusetts Institute of Technology alumni
American women academics